Stan Rettew is a former American football, baseball, and softball coach and college athletics administrator. He served as the head football coach at Mayville State University in Mayville, North Dakota in from 1996 to 2001 and Huron University—in Huron, South Dakota from 2002 to 2004, compiling a career college football record of 18–58. Rettew was also the head baseball coach at Iowa Wesleyan College—now known as Iowa Wesleyan University—in Mount Pleasant, Iowa from 1985 to 1986, tallying a mark of 26–27, and the head softball coach at Mayville State from 1994 to 1998.

Rettew attended Warwick High School in Lititz, Pennsylvania, where he played football and was a member of the Lancaster-Lebanon League championship team in 1977. He went on to Salem College—now known as Salem University—Salem, West Virginia before transferring to Iowa Wesleyan.

Head coaching record

Notes

References

External links
 Valparaiso profile

Year of birth missing (living people)
Living people
American football offensive guards
Huron Screaming Eagles athletic directors
Huron Screaming Eagles football coaches
Iowa Wesleyan Tigers baseball coaches
Iowa Wesleyan Tigers football coaches
Iowa Wesleyan Tigers football players
Mayville State Comets athletic directors
Mayville State Comets football coaches
North Dakota State Bison football coaches
Shippensburg Red Raiders football coaches
Valparaiso Beacons football coaches
College softball coaches in the United States
North Dakota State University alumni
Salem International University alumni
People from Lititz, Pennsylvania
Coaches of American football from Pennsylvania
Players of American football from Pennsylvania
Baseball coaches from Pennsylvania